Riverdale was a provincial riding in Ontario, Canada that existed from 1914 to 1999. It occupied an area east of the Don River from the city limits just north of Danforth Avenue south to Lake Ontario. It was named after the neighbourhood of Riverdale. In 1999 a major reduction in Ontario seats resulted in Riverdale being merged with part of East York into a larger riding called Broadview-Greenwood.

The 1964 by-election in this riding is well known for being among the first elections in Canadian history where a party (the NDP) used door to door canvassing and a get out the vote effort.

Boundaries
In 1914 the riding was created out of the Toronto East riding. Its initial borders were Logan Avenue from Ashbridges Bay to the city limits just north of the Danforth. The northern boundary followed the city limits with East York east to Woodbine Avenue. The eastern boundary followed this road south to the lake.

In 1926 five ridings were added to Toronto. Three new ridings were created to the east of Riverdale called Greenwood, Woodbine and Beaches. The borders of Riverdale were altered to accommodate the new ridings. The western boundary was moved west to the Don River and this encompassed parts of the old Toronto Southeast and Toronto Northeast ridings. The eastern boundary was moved to Carlaw Avenue which bordered Greenwood riding.

Prior to the 1934 election, the riding of Greenwood was dissolved and split between Beaches riding to the east and Riverdale to the west. The new western boundary became Jones Avenue from Queen Street East to Danforth Avenue. North of Danforth Avenue the boundary continued along Dewhurst Avenue and south of Queen Street the boundary continued along Berkshire Avenue and south to the lake.

In 1966 the boundaries on the east and west sides were altered. To the west it was moved east from the banks of the Don River. Instead it started on the south where Carlaw Avenue met Toronto Harbour. It went north along Carlaw to Queen Street East, then west along Queen to DeGrassi St. It went north along DeGrassi until Gerrard, west along Gerrard until Broadview Avenue, north along Broadview until Sparkhall Avenue, east along Sparkhall until Hampton Avenue and north along Hampton until it reached Danforth Avenue. North of Danforth it continued along Jackman Avenue until it reached the city limits. On the east side, next to the neighbouring riding of Beaches-Woodbine, the border started at the lake and went north along Coxwell Avenue to Queen Street East. A one block jog west and then it went north along Rhodes Avenue to the Danforth. At Danforth it jogged back east to Coxwell and then followed this street north to the city limits.

In 1974 the eastern boundary with Beaches-Woodbine was altered. The new border consisted of Coxwell Avenue from Lake Ontario north to the railway right-of-way just south of Hanson Street. The boundary followed the right-of-way west until Greenwood Avenue. It then went north along Greenwood until it met the city limits.

The boundaries were further altered in 1987. The western boundary was moved back to the Don River. This was followed north to the Toronto city limits. Going east it followed the city limits to Coxwell Avenue. It turned south following Coxwell to the Canadian National Railway right-of-way. It went west along the right-of-way turning south following Greenwood Avenue to Queen Street East, then west to Leslie Street, and then south to Lake Ontario.

It was merged into the riding of merged into the Toronto-Danforth in 1996 prior to the election in 1999.

Members of Provincial Parliament

Election results

1914 boundaries

1926 boundaries

1934 boundaries

1966 boundaries

1974 boundaries

1987 boundaries

References

Notes

Citations

Former provincial electoral districts of Ontario
Provincial electoral districts of Toronto